Norax was an ancient mythological hero of the Nuragic Sardinian mythology. He was the son of the god Hermes and Eriteide (Erytheia), who was the daughter of Geryon. Norax appears in the writings of Pausanias, Sallust and Solinus.

Mythology
According to Pausanias, Norax came to the island at the helm of the Iberians who later founded the city of Nora. Solinus specifically stated that Norax arrived in Sardinia from the mythical city of Tartessos located in southern Iberia.

See also
 Sardus
 Iolaus

Notes

References 

 Pausanias, Description of Greece with an English Translation by W.H.S. Jones, Litt.D., and H.A. Ormerod, M.A., in 4 Volumes. Cambridge, MA, Harvard University Press; London, William Heinemann Ltd. 1918. . Online version at the Perseus Digital Library
 Pausanias, Graeciae Descriptio. 3 vols. Leipzig, Teubner. 1903.  Greek text available at the Perseus Digital Library.

Sardinian culture
Heroes in mythology and legend

Characters in Greek mythology